Being culpable, also known as culpability, is a measure of the degree to which an agent can be held morally or legally responsible for action and inaction.

Culpable may also refer to:

 Culpable (film), 1960 Argentine film
 "Culpable" (song), 2010 song by Mexican singer Belinda
 Culpable (podcast), 2019 podcast hosted by Dennis Cooper